Hikma, or other romanisations such as Hikmah and Hekme, may refer to:

Education 
Al-Hikmah University, a private university in Ilorin, Nigeria
Al-Hikma University (Baghdad), a former university in Baghdad, Iraq
Dar Al-Hekma University, a women's tertiary institute in Jeddah, Saudi Arabia
Collège de la Sagesse, also known as Al Hekmeh, private school in Beirut, Lebanon
Sagesse High School, also known as Hekmeh High School, a private school in Beirut, Lebanon
Université La Sagesse, also known as Al Hekmeh University, academic institute in Furn-El-Chebak, Lebanon
House of Wisdom (Bayt al-Ḥikmah), a former library and translation institute in Baghdad, Iraq

Sports 
Sagesse SC, also known as Hekmeh, a Lebanese multi-sports club
Sagesse SC (basketball), a Lebanese basketball club
Sagesse SC (football), a Lebanese football club

Other 
Hikmah, the concept of wisdom in Islamic philosophy
Hikma Pharmaceuticals, a British multinational pharmaceutical company
Al Hekma Tower, a skyscraper in Dubai, United Arab Emirates

See also
Sagesse (disambiguation)
Wisdom (disambiguation)